Leones del Escogido (English: Chosen One Lions or Lions of Chosen One or Picked Lions) is a professional baseball team in Santo Domingo, Dominican Republic. Of the 17 won championships, 16 are of the Liga Dominicana de Béisbol (LIDOM) Winter League.

Leones defeated Tigres del Licey in 6 games to win the 2015-2016 championship, in a best-of-nine series with 5 over 1 games won.

In the 2014 Baseball Caribbean Series to be played in Hermosillo, they represented Dominican Republic but lost the final 4-3 to the Mexican team Yaquis de Obregón. Leones beat Yaquis in their first two matchups and finished the Caribbean Series with the best record 5-2, including the final.

History
The Leones''' record book is dominated by the Alou brothers: Matty, Felipe and Jesús.  The brothers hold the first, second and third spots in the team's record book for the following: games played, runs, at bats, hits, home runs and RBIs. Matty and Felipe are one-two in several more categories, including walks and stolen bases.  Felipe Alou is also the most successful manager, winning four championships.

2009-10 Season

The Leones enjoyed a very successful first year with new ownership.  They won their third straight "City Championship Trophy" over Tigres del Licey, their rivals who share Estadio Quisqueya in Santo Domingo, after winning six of their ten regular season games against Licey.  They followed this by winning the regular season with a 30-19 record, and won their thirteenth Winter League Championship, ending their 18-year National Championship drought.  Leones represented the Dominican Republic in the Caribbean Series, and won their third title with a 5-1 record.

2010-11 Season

On 20 March 2010, General Manager Moisés Alou announced that Ken Oberkfell will return to manage Leones del Escogido for the 2010–2011 season.
The team won their fourth straight City Championship Trophy this season, securing the season series with their win over Licey on 9 December.  
Leones made it to the postseason, but failed to reach the finals, which were eventually won by Toros del Este.

2011-12 Season

After struggling in the regular season, Leones clinched a spot in the Round Robin.  They finished the Round Robin in first place, setting up a 9-game Finals against Aguilas.  Despite blowing a commanding 3-0 series lead, Leones won their fourteenth championship in dramatic fashion with a come from behind win in game 9.  Leones also won the Caribbean Series hosted by Dominican Republic.

2012-13 Season

Leones again struggled in the regular season, but won their final three games to force a one-game playoff against Gigantes del Cibao. Leones won the game 5-2, and joined Águilas Cibaeñas, Toros del Este, and Estrellas Orientales in the Round Robin. Águilas and Leones advanced to the Final, ending the Round Robin in 17 games. Leones swept Águilas in 5 games to win their third crown in four years and their fifteenth overall.

Leones cruised in the Caribbean Series group stage, winning 5 out of 6 games, but lost the final to Mexico in 18 innings 4-3.

2013-14 Season

On 1 December 2013, Leones beat Tigres del Licey 1-0 and secured the City Championship Trophy. Leones won the regular season with 31-19, qualifying for the Round Robin. On 14 January 2014, Jon Leicester, Ramon Garcia, Fernando Rodney, and Armando Rodriguez threw a combined no-hitter to Licey, clinching the Round Robin and home field advantage in the Finals. It was just the 8th no-hitter in the history of Dominican Winter League. They faced Tigres del Licey in the Finals, losing the series 5-3.

2014-15 Season

Leones had a disappointing season, finishing in last place. Licey also failed to reach the playoffs, making it the first time in the league's history that both teams from Santo Domingo missed the postseason.

2015-16 Season

Leones finished the season with a 25-25 record, enough for third place in the standings and qualifying to the semifinal round. After 18 games in the semifinals, Leones and Toros del Este were tied  with a 9-9 record, and had to play a decisive extra game, which Leones won 7-2. This sent the team to the finals against archrivals Tigres del Licey, just one year after they both failed to qualify for the postseason for the first time in history. In the best-of-nine finals, Leones jumped to a commanding 4-0 lead, before losing game 5 in the 9th inning. The team won their 16th Championship in game 6, when they defeated the Tigres del Licey 8-3. In the 2016 Caribbean Series celebrated in Estadio Quisqueya, Leones finished in last place with a 0-4 record.

Championship history
Leones del Escogido won the first championship in 1922 of a short-lived professional baseball era from 1922 to 1937, but only the current Winter League format established in 1951 is widely accepted.

Caribbean Series Championships
Leones del Escogido have won four Caribbean Series in their history.

Notable players

Felipe Alou
Jesús Alou
Matty Alou
Angel Baez Aquino
Rafael Bautista
Wilson Betemit
Mario Brito
Starlin Castro
Francisco Cordero
José DeLeón
Octavio Dotel
Juan Encarnación
Julio Franco
Rafael Furcal
Pedro Guerrero
Vladimir Guerrero Jr.
Wilton Guerrero
Ramon Emilio Jimenez
Rufino Linares
Francisco Liriano
Pepe Lucas
Juan Marichal
Starling Marte
Quinton McCracken
Raúl Mondesí
José "Makey" Moreno
José Nuñez
David Ortiz
Neifi Pérez
Tony Polanco
Luis Pujols
Steve Ratzer
Tim Raines
Alex Rodriguez
Juan Samuel
Liam Sheldon
Sammy Sosa
Mario Soto
Yoshitomo Tsutsugoh
Juan Uribe
Tim Wallach
Enrique Wilson
Albert Pujols
Wander FrancoCurrent Roster 2016-17'''

See also

Professional baseball in the Dominican Republic
 Tigres del Licey
 Caribbean World Series

External links
Official Site

Baseball teams in the Dominican Republic
Sport in Santo Domingo
Baseball teams established in 1921
1921 establishments in North America